"Vanity Kills" is a song by English new wave and synth-pop band ABC, released as the third single from their third studio album, How to Be a ... Zillionaire! (1985). It peaked at No. 70 on the UK Singles Chart and reached No. 91 on the U.S. Billboard Hot 100.

Composition
The song is in a C key and a major mode with a BPM of 125.

Music video
Two music videos were made by the band ABC.  The UK video shows the four band members moving against a dark background, using simple stop motion camera tricks.

The US version, directed by Peter Care, has a spoken prologue and epilogue, and presents Martin Fry and Mark White as noir detectives, investigating a variety of shady characters.

Track listing
 UK 7" Single
"Vanity Kills"
"Judy's Jewels"

Chart performance

References

External links
 

ABC (band) songs
1985 singles
Songs written by Martin Fry
Songs written by Mark White (musician)
1985 songs
Mercury Records singles